John Wollaston may refer to:

 John Wollaston (priest) (1791–1856), Anglican clergyman and settler in Western Australia
 John Wollaston (painter) (active 1742–1775), English painter of portraits active in the British colonies in North America
 John Wollaston (Lord Mayor) (died 1658), English merchant who was Lord Mayor of London in 1643